Pulau Tekukor (Turtle Dove) is one of the Southern Islands of Singapore. The island was also known as Pulau Penyabong. It is also the site of a former ammunition dump. There have been proposals to turn the island into a residential area, resort or eco-park (Monkey Island).

External links
 Monkey Island

Islands of Singapore
Southern Islands